Kajo Keji  is an airstrip serving the town of Kajo Keji, in South Sudan.

Overview
Kajo Keji Airstrip  is located in Kajo Keji County, in Central Equatoria State, in the town of Kajo Keji, near the International border with the Republic of Uganda.

The distance between Juba International Airport and Kajo Keji Airstrip by air is approximately 112.8 km (70.1 mi). The geographic coordinates of Kago Kaju Airport are: 3° 51' 19.00"N, 31° 39' 32.00"E (Latitude: 3.9170; Longitude: 31.6670). This airport sits at an elevation of 952 metres (2,500 ft) above sea level.
The airstrip has a single unpaved runway, the dimensions of which, are not publicly known at this time.

See also
 Equatoria Region
 List of airports in South Sudan

References

External links
 Location of Kajo Keji Airstrip At Google Maps

Airports in South Sudan
Central Equatoria
Equatoria